When I See You Again is a 2015 Taiwanese romantic comedy television series produced by Sanlih E-Television, starring Jasper Liu, Mandy Wei, Jet Chao and Ivy Shao as the main cast. The Chinese title literally translates to "He Saw Her A 2nd Time". Filming began on May 12, 2015 and continued as it aired. First original broadcast began May 31, 2015 on TTV channel airing on Sunday nights from 10:00–11:30 pm.

Synopsis
Ocean Private Equity, Director of Investment Xia You Qian is young, handsome and particularly good at his job. His keen eye to detail has helped him advance in his career and has given him the special ability to "read others' minds". But unknown to most, ten years ago he was an unattractive, geeky student who was constantly made fun of and bullied by fellow students in his hometown, Pu Lang Village. One day, as he was being bullied, a popular and pretty girl, An Xi, came to his rescue. You Qian eventually fell-in-love with An Xi after she displayed multiple acts of kindness towards him despite his unusual appearance and habits. On the day he'd risked his life hiking the woods of Pu Lang Village to obtain what An Xi wished for (a small bottle of Angel's Tears, which was simply the water from a hard-to-get lake near the village), he caught her at a bad moment because she had just found out her mother left her and was never going to come back. With her frustration in mind, she took out all her anger on the poor boy who had just come to profess his admiration to her. Heartbroken by her harsh words, You Qian leaves Pu Lang Village, promising never to return.

Ten years later, work forces You Qian to go back to Pu Lang Village when the CEO of Ocean Private Equity has plans to develop in the village and sends him there in advance to scout the land. With his changed outer appearance and confidence demeanor, none of the village residents recognizes the ex-villager. He re-encounters An Xi and misinterprets that she has become a gold digger when she goes to the same hotel he is staying at to meet her creditor who holds the loan debt of her hostel inn. After getting acquainted with the village locals he realize that An Xi is still the kind selfless person he remembers her to be. He decides to help her get out of debt from the creditor who is trying to force her into marrying him. After getting her land title back from her creditor, You Qian then decides to hold on to the inn's deed. He feels that An Xi does not even feel sorry for causing him the harm that she did so many years back, and takes to her to be a cold hearted individual. Hurt from her cold attitude when talking about his old self (the "guy who confessed to her"), he decides to attempt to get revenge on her. Yet his plans don't quite go as he wishes.

Cast

Main cast
Jasper Liu as Xia You Qian – Male age 28
Mandy Wei as An Xi – Female age 28
 as Hu Yan Ze – Male age 30
Ivy Shao as Hu Yong Qing – Female age 27

Supporting cast
Vent Teng as Xia Bai Kang – Male age 75
 as Zhou Zhi Yue – Female age 52
 as Zhong Da Yu – Male age 25
 as Zhang Ya Lu – Male age 28
 as Zhang Ya En – Female age 26
Hey Girl (group)#Tina Chou (Da Ya) (Old Leader) as Wu Zhi Lin – Female age 28
 (Xiu Qin) as Jin Mei Wen – Female age 38
 as Jiang Hai Kuo – Male age 32

Guest cast
 as Anchor
 as Tang Dong 
Yeh Hui-chi as Village Leader
Kuo Hsuan-chi as Da Hu 
 as Xiao Hu 
Chen Yu-bi as Yuan Zhang
Lu Fu-ling as Yuan Zhang's wife
Tseng Zi-yi as Xu Da Wei 
Michael Huang as An Ding Yuan
Chiao Zi-chi as Zi Qi 
Hope Lin as Jennifer
Ric Huang as Da Fei Ge

Development and casting
A press conference was held on May 12, 2014 at SETTV headquarters lobby in Neihu District, Taipei introducing the main leads of the drama. The blessing ceremony was also held later that day in front of SETTV main entrance. 
The premier press conference was held on Friday May 29, 2015 12:30 pm at TTV headquarters in Songshan District, Taipei. The extended cast was unveiled and an extended 12-minute trailer was previewed. Fans were also invited via first-come, first-served seating to meet the cast.

Broadcast

Episode ratings

Awards and nominations

References

External links
When I See You Again SETTV Official website 
When I See You Again TTV Official website 
When I See You Again Official Facebook page 

2015 Taiwanese television series debuts
2015 Taiwanese television series endings
Sanlih E-Television original programming
Taiwan Television original programming
Taiwanese romance television series